Sedum laxum is a species of flowering plant in the family Crassulaceae known by the common name roseflower stonecrop. It is native to southwestern Oregon and northwestern California, where it can be found in rocky mountainous habitat. It is a succulent plant forming basal rosettes of oval or oblong leaves up to 3 centimeters long. The inflorescence is made up of one or more erect arrays of many flowers. The flowers have reddish or yellowish petals up to 1.3 centimeters long each.

References

External links
Jepson Manual Treatment
USDA Plants Profile
Photo gallery

laxum
Flora of California
Flora of Oregon
Taxa named by Nathaniel Lord Britton
Taxa named by Alwin Berger
Flora without expected TNC conservation status